Prokurator Alicja Horn is a 1933 Polish film directed by Marta Flanz and Michał Waszyński. The film's art direction was by Jacek Rotmil.

Cast
Jadwiga Smosarska ... Alicja Horn 
Zofia Mirska ... Julka 
Franciszek Brodniewicz ... Jan Winkler 
Bogusław Samborski ... Prof. Brunicki 
Loda Halama ... Dancer 
Jan Kurnakowicz ... Journalist 
Tadeusz Fijewski ... Journalist 
Irena Skwierczyńska ... unidentified character  
Wanda Jarszewska ... unidentified character  
Wojciech Ruszkowski ... unidentified character  
Paweł Owerłło ... unidentified character  
Stanisław Grolicki ... unidentified character

External links 
 

1933 films
1930s Polish-language films
Polish black-and-white films
Films directed by Michał Waszyński
Films based on Polish novels
Films based on works by Tadeusz Dołęga-Mostowicz
Polish romance films
1930s romance films
1930s action films